2019 Georgian Super Cup was a Georgian football match that was played on 24 February 2019 between the champions of the 2018 Erovnuli Liga, FC Saburtalo Tbilisi, and the winner of the 2018 Georgian Cup, FC Torpedo Kutaisi.

Match details

See also
2018 Erovnuli Liga
2018 Georgian Cup

References

2019
FC Torpedo Kutaisi
Supercup
Georgian Super Cup